This page lists more than 100 small arms designs which have been produced in numbers exceeding one million since the late 18th century. Many more types have been made in the hundreds of thousands. Many of the firearms on this list are military weapons which were used during both World Wars, so it is unsurprising that they were manufactured in such high numbers. Others are designed for civilian hunting and sport shooting, which generally sell very well in countries such as the U.S. and Canada. Many of those produced have been destroyed, deactivated or fallen into disrepair, but others will have been kept in working order and sold or passed on from one generation to another down the years.

In 2018, Small Arms Survey reported that there are over one billion small arms distributed globally, of which 857 million (about 85 percent) are in civilian hands. U.S. civilians alone account for 393 million (about 46 percent) of the worldwide total of civilian held firearms. This amounts to "120.5 firearms for every 100 residents." The world's armed forces control about 133 million (about 13 percent) of the global total of small arms, of which over 43 percent belong to two countries, the Russian Federation (30.3 million) and the People's Republic of China (27.5 million). Law enforcement agencies control about 23 million (about 2 percent) of the global total of small arms.

Estimates put the production of firearm cartridges at 10-14 billion per year according to Oxfam, or 27-38 million a day.

Estimates of production of the Kalashnikov AK-47 and derivative weapons may be exaggerated. Various sources quote figures between 35 and 150 million. In his 2001 book 'The AK-47', Chris McNab claims it is "feasible" that production of the Chinese Type 56 assault rifle – a license-built AK-47 copy – reached 15-20 million. McNab bases that estimate on the "apparent" strength of the Chinese armed forces of 10 million (3 million regular troops and 5-7 million reservists) and presumed export sales. However, the true strength of the People's Liberation Army was around 1.5 million in 2013. Furthermore, as late as the 1979 Sino-Vietnamese war most Chinese soldiers were armed with another weapon, the Type 56 carbine (an SKS copy), and were soon after re-equipped with the Type 81 assault rifle, followed later by the QBZ-95 and QBZ-03, all of which are unrelated to the Kalashnikov design.

Designs produced in numbers exceeding 1 million

Designs produced in numbers from 100,000 to 1,000,000

Citations

References

External links 
 Colt serial numbers:Serial Number Data

Most produced
Military lists
Militaria
Hunting
Arms control